The southern birch mouse (Sicista subtilis) is a species of birch mouse in the family Sminthidae. It is native to southern Russia, Kazakhstan, and potentially northern Mongolia and China.

Taxonomy 
The Hungarian birch mouse (S. trizona) and Nordmann's birch mouse (S. loriger) were previously thought to be subspecies representing isolated western populations of S. subtilis, but phylogenetic and anatomical evidence supports them being distinct species.

A 2018 study detected a distinct, previously unknown genetic lineage of S. subtilis in the North Caucasus.

Description 
The most prominent characteristic of the southern birch mouse is the dark stripe down the center of the back, which is bordered by two narrow bright stripes on both sides. From head to rump it measures from 56 to 72 mm, with a tail from 110 to 130% of the main body length. The background fur color is gray-brown.

Ecology 
The southern birch mouse is pronouncedly a steppe dweller. It makes a burrow in the summer and hibernates. It eats green plants and insects.

References 

  Macdonald D. : Die Große Enzyklopädie der Säugetiere, Könemann Verlag in der Tandem Verlag GmbH, Königswinter, 2004.
  Detlef Schilling u. a. : BLV Bestimmungsbuch Säugetiere, BLV Verlagsgesellschaft, 1983 

This page is based on a translation of the corresponding article from the German Wikipedia.

Sicista
Mammals of Russia
Fauna of Kazakhstan
Mammals of Mongolia
Mammals of China
Mammals described in 1773